Gaziray is a commuter rail line serving Gaziantep, Turkey. Being 25 km (16 mi) long, the line is the fourth commuter rail system in the country, after İZBAN, Marmaray, and Başkentray. The system is also a part of major upgrades along the Mersin-Adana-Osmaniye-Gaziantep railway corridor.

Background

Gaziray is a joint venture between the Turkish State Railways and the Gaziantep Metropolitan Municipality to expand the existing right-of-way from a single-track route to a triple-track route, with segregated train traffic, as well as constructing new stations and renovating existing ones. A new  tunnel, located west of Gaziantep station, is also included within the project. Construction began in March 2016 and was expected to be completed towards the end of 2018, however as of June 2019 the project is 85% complete. The line started operating on November 5th, 2022. 

Similar to many other rail-transport systems in Turkey, the name Gaziray is a portmanteau of Gazi from Gaziantep and ray, which is the Turkish word for rail.

Stations

There are a total of sixteen stations on the 25,532 kilometers (15,865 mi) long Gaziray line, two of which are underground, all of which are suitable for disabled access.

References

Railway lines in Turkey
Standard gauge railways in Turkey